Glossogobius flavipinnis is a species from the family Gobiidae endemic to Lake Towuti in Sulawesi, Indonesia,> where it is generally found at shallow depths over hard bottoms. This species can reach a length of  TL, although in a review of museum specimens the largest male was only  and the largest female . It is overall uniform dark with a yellow first dorsal fin. It was previously known under the name Stupidogobius flavipinnis.

References

flavipinnis
Freshwater fish of Sulawesi
Taxonomy articles created by Polbot
Fish described in 1938